Georges Vanier was a Canadian soldier and former Governor General of Canada.

Georges Vanier may also refer to:

École secondaire Georges-P.-Vanier, a high school in Hamilton, Ontario
École secondaire Georges-Vanier in Laval, Quebec
Georges P. Vanier Junior High School in Fall River, Nova Scotia
Georges P. Vanier Secondary School in Courtenay, British Columbia
General Vanier Elementary School in Winnipeg, Manitoba
General Vanier Intermediate School in Cornwall, Ontario
Georges Vanier Catholic School, an elementary school in Ottawa, Ontario
Georges Vanier Elementary School in Surrey, British Columbia
Georges Vanier Secondary School in Toronto, Ontario
Georges-Vanier (Montreal Metro), metro station in Montreal, Quebec